Vaikunda Perumal Temple may refer to several places:
Tiru Parameswara Vinnagaram, a temple in Kanchipuram, Tamil Nadu, India
Vaikunda Perumal Temple, Uthiramerur, a temple in Uthiramerur, Tamil Nadu, India
Vaikunta Perumal Mangadu, a temple near Mangadu, Tamil Nadu, India
 Srivaikuntanathan Permual Temple, at Srivaikuntam, Tamil Nadu, India